Munich Hirschgarten is a Munich S-Bahn railway station on the main line between Laim and Donnersbergerbrücke railway stations at Friedenheimer Brücke. It was opened in December 2009 and provides transportation access for the new quarter under development at Birketweg nearby. In early planning stages, the proposed name was "Friedenheimer Brücke". The station is served by the lines S1, S2, S3, S4, S6 and S8 of the Munich S-Bahn network, which connect the station with the city centre (all lines), Munich Airport (S1 and S8) and suburban areas. Each of these lines run services every 20 minutes, with some increased to every 10 minutes during peak hours, therefore connecting Hirschgarten with the city centre every 2–4 minutes.

References

References 

Hirschgarten
Hirschgarten
Railway stations in Germany opened in 2009